Kenya national basketball team is the national men basketball team in Kenya. It is operated by the Kenya Basketball Federation (KBF).

Kenya hosted the 1993 FIBA Africa Championship where the team beat Algeria by a 80-50 blowout and progressed to the semi final on a point differential, its best performance to date.

History
Basketball in Kenya was started in Mang'u High School in the 1960s by the Marianist Brothers when Brother Frank Russell took over as Principal. He had previous experience in the USA as a sports master and basketball coach in several schools.

Kenya beat Africa's 11-time champion Angola 74–73 in the AfroBasket 2021 qualification in Yaoundé, Cameroon, hence booking a place at the African tournament for the first time since 1993.

In 2020, Kenya hired Australian Liz Mills as head coach, the first female coach in the Morans' history. She helped the team qualify for AfroBasket 2021, its first tournament in 18 years. Mills became the first female head coach to coach at an AfroBasket tournament.

In 2022, Kenya hired former national team coach Cliff Owuor for the 2023 FIBA World Cup Qualifiers. Under Owuor leadership the team went 0-6 in the first round of the qualifiers and failed to progress to the second round. Owuor will continue to lead the team for the 2023 FIBA AfoCan with the team automatically qualifying to the final round due to the team finishing runners up in the 2019 edition.

Kenya also has a u16 boys team and a u18 boys team that are also part of FIBA and the Olympic Committee. Kenyas u18 National Team is led by their team captain from Chicago, Illinois. His name is Iffi Kazmi, a 6'2 Guard that plays for Chi-Prep Sports Academy.

Competitions

AfroBasket
 Fourth place

African Games
1987 – 4th
2019 – To Be Determined

FIBA AfroCan
 Runners-up

Team

Current roster
Roster for the AfroBasket 2021.

Depth chart

Head coach position
 Ronnie Owino – 1993, 2001–02, 2007, 2010
 Francis Ngunjiri – 2013
Cliff Owuor – 2020
 Liz Mills – 2021

Past rosters
Team for the 2015 Afrobasket Qualification:

See also
Kenya national under-19 basketball team
Kenya women's national basketball team

References

External links
FIBA profile
Kenya Basketball Records at FIBA Archive

Kenya
Basketball
Basketball in Kenya
Basketball teams in Kenya
1965 establishments in Kenya